The Alley of Golden Hearts is a 1924 British silent drama film directed by Bertram Phillips and starring Queenie Thomas, John Stuart and Frank Stanmore.

Cast
 Queenie Thomas as Charity 
 John Stuart as Jack  
 Frank Stanmore as Grocer 
 Mary Brough 
 Bernard Vaughan 
 Adeline Hayden Coffin 
 Judd Green 
 Polly Emery
 Cecil Morton York as Sir James / Paul

References

Bibliography
 Low, Rachael. History of the British Film, 1918-1929. George Allen & Unwin, 1971.

External links
 

1924 films
1924 drama films
British drama films
British silent feature films
Films directed by Bertram Phillips
Films set in England
British black-and-white films
1920s English-language films
1920s British films
Silent drama films